Dance To The Radio is a British independent record label, based in Leeds, England.

History  
It was named after the refrain of the Joy Division song "Transmission". The label launched with the release of a compilation album 'Dance To The Radio: Leeds' at an eponymous launch event in Leeds in March 2005.

The label subsequently released some 7" singles by the likes of iLiKETRAiNS, The Pigeon Detectives, Yes Boss, Napoleon IIIrd, This Et Al and ¡Forward, Russia!. They have been featured a number of times in NME, Drowned in Sound and in Artrocker for being a notable success of the DIY ethic in the indie music scene at the moment.

Their first full scale single release was Twelve by ¡Forward, Russia! which reached number 36 in the UK Singles Chart.  Their second release, again by ¡Forward, Russia!, was a re-release of limited edition debut single "Nine" which also became a top 40 hit. Since these, three more ¡Forward, Russia! singles have been released; "Eighteen", "Nineteen" and "Don't Be A Doctor" the latter of which was a limited White Label Release. The label went on to achieve great success with The Pigeon Detectives. Other early releases include singles from Yes Boss, Sky Larkin, Shut Your Eyes And You'll Burst Into Flames, Bobby Cook and Grammatics.

The label have released EPs for bands like iLiKETRAiNS and Napoleon IIIrd, a number of compilations, and numerous albums.

In 2009 the label launched a new series of compilation 12" records entitled 4x12". Amongst the bands appearing on this series of records included Pulled Apart by Horses, Das Racist, Paul Thomas Saunders, Holy State, Bear Hands & Suckers. The 3rd in the series received critical acclaim from NME, Drowned in Sound and Artrocker.  This was followed by releases in 2010 for Elinor Rose Dougall and Leeds post-punk-noise band Holy State.

2011 saw the release of The Pigeon Detectives third album 'Up Guards and At 'Em!'.  The fourth Pigeon Detectives record 'We Met at Sea' was licensed by Dance to the Radio to Cooking Vinyl in 2013, and became the band's last charting album to date in the UK Albums Chart, peaking at number 41.

After 2013, Dance to the Radio carried on running a stage at Leeds Festival, but no new records were released until the label was relaunched in 2016 in association with The Orchard and Sony Label Services. Dance to the Radio also set up a publishing entity in partnership with Sentric Music Publishing and was also the artist management arm of The Futuresound Group in Leeds, until being rebranded as fam. (Futuresound Artist Management).

In 2017, the label released new music from The Pigeon Detectives, and signed new UK acts FLING, Dead Naked Hippies, Far Caspian, Tallsaint, Leo Cosmos, Low Hummer and Jake Whiskin.

In 2020, Futuresound (the artist management and festivals company, known for the Last Time Out and Get Together Festivals in Yorkshire) relaunched sister label Slam Dunk Records, originally the label You Me at Six were signed to and a record company which shares its name with their indie rock and alternative festival Slam Dunk.

As of 2022, Dance to the Radio has 20 year old indie-pop girl Ellur signed to their label alongside Sfven and Scottish singer-songwriter Tommy Ashby.

Dance To The Radio Stage at Leeds Festival
Since 2007 Dance To The Radio have hosted a stage at Leeds Festival. Held on the BBC Introducing Stage band who have played the stage include Wild Beasts, Blood Red Shoes, Dinosaur Pile-Up, The Pigeon Detectives, Bear In Heaven, Chickenhawk (now Hawk Eyes), Spectrals, Young Knives, Dog Is Dead, Dutch Uncles, Hookworms, ¡Forward, Russia!, Sky Larkin and more. The stage is hosted on the Thursday evening and is the only stage with live music on this day.

2007 Line Up

¡Forward, Russia!, Shut Your Eyes and You'll Burst Into Flames, Sky Larkin, The Wallbirds, Grammatics

2008 Line Up

Grammatics, Broken Records, The Pigeon Detectives (Secret Set), The Wallbirds, Dinosaur Pile-Up, Wintermute

2009 Line Up

Blood Red Shoes, Wild Beasts, Bear Hands, Airship, Holy State

2010 Line Up

Get Cape, Wear Cape, Fly, Bear In Heaven, Chickenhawk, Spectrals, The Neat

2011 Line Up

Young Knives, Dog Is Dead, We Are Losers, Runaround Kids, Blacklisters

2012 Line Up

Little Comets, Various Cruelties, Scars On 45, China Rats, Likely Lads

2013 Line Up

Dutch Uncles, Hookworms, The Crookes, Black Moth, Menace Beach

2014 Line Up

TOY, Superfood, Honeyblood, Fryars, Post War Glamour Girls

2015 Line Up

Pulled Apart By Horses, The Bohicas, VITAMIN, Carnabells, Redfaces

2016 Line Up

Blood Red Shoes, The Wytches, Freak, Blackwaters, Forever Cult

2017 Line Up

The Pigeon Detectives, High Tyde, FLING, Marsicans, Dead Naked Hippies

2018 Line Up

The Blinders, Anteros, Boy Azooga, Tallsaint, Far Caspian

2019 Line Up

Easy Life, Whenyoung, Indoor Pets, BILK, DJ Jacky P

Discography

See also
 List of record labels

References

External links
Dance To The Radio's official website
The Pigeon Detectives' official website

British independent record labels
Record labels established in 2004